Harry Frederick Oppenheimer (28 October 1908 – 19 August 2000) was a prominent South African businessman, industrialist and philanthropist. Oppenheimer was often ranked as one of the wealthiest people in the world, and was considered South Africa's foremost industrialist for four decades. In 2004 he was voted 60th in the SABC3's Great South Africans.

Early life and education
The son of May (Pollack) and Sir Ernest Oppenheimer, Harry was born to an assimilated Jewish family of German origins in Kimberley, the original centre for diamond mining in South Africa, and lived most of his life in Johannesburg. He had a formal Bar mitzvah ("coming of age") ceremony in the Kimberley synagogue when he turned thirteen. He converted to Christianity when he married his wife.

After completing his primary schooling in Johannesburg, he attended Charterhouse School in England, before going on to study at Christ Church, Oxford, graduating in 1931 in Philosophy, Politics and Economics. When he married his wife Bridget (née McCall), he chose to enter the Anglican Church, but remained a supporter of Jewish causes during his entire life. He authorised the flow of diamonds to Israel's important diamond-sorting and diamond-cutting industry.

Career
Harry Oppenheimer was the chairman of Anglo American Corporation for 25 years and chairman of De Beers Consolidated Mines for 27 years until he retired from those positions in 1982 and 1984 respectively. His son, Nicky Oppenheimer, became Deputy Chairman of Anglo American Corporation in 1983 and Chairman of De Beers in 1998. His daughter, Mary Slack, resides predominantly at Brenthurst, a suburb of Johannesburg, but has houses in Muizenberg and London, England, and a commercially successful thoroughbred breeding farm situated about an hour-and-a-half north from Cape Town. The stud farm trades under the name Wilgerbosdrift Stud, and has bred some successful horses.

He also spent some time as the Member of Parliament for Kimberley (1948 to 1957) and became the opposition spokesman on economics, finance and constitutional affairs.

Philanthropy
He was also generous to the official philanthropies of the State of Israel. He personally directed that Israel receive the necessary diamond raw products from De Beers to establish itself as one of the world's diamond polishing and exporting countries.

In the 1970s and 1980s, he financed the anti-apartheid Progressive Federal Party that later merged into the Democratic Alliance. He was a South African Freemason.

Kimberley conferred Freedom of the City on Oppenheimer on 4 September 1973 as a tribute to "an illustrious son of the city" who continued to promote Kimberley as "the diamond centre of the world."

The Harry Oppenheimer Agricultural High School in Limburg, Limpopo is named in his honour in recognition of the funds he provided for its establishment.

The Harry Oppenheimer Fellowship Award, Africa's premier research prize, is awarded every year by the Oppenheimer Memorial Trust, in memory of Harry Oppenheimer's commitment to an ideal of "unambiguous excellence."

Honour
Harry Oppenheimer Diamond Museum in Ramat Gan, Israel, was founded in 1986 to present his life and career.

References

External links
Harry Oppenheimer (His life and achievements)

1908 births
2000 deaths
South African Anglicans
South African Jews
Harry
Converts to Anglicanism from Judaism
South African mining businesspeople
Diamond dealers
South African racehorse owners and breeders
People educated at Charterhouse School
South African people of German-Jewish descent
20th-century South African businesspeople
South African philanthropists
South African Freemasons
20th-century philanthropists
De Beers people
Chancellors of the University of Cape Town